The RU Hohen Neuendorf is a German rugby union club from Hohen Neuendorf, currently playing in the  Rugby-Bundesliga.

The club is located in the Oberhavel district, north west of Berlin. The district is home to two more rugby union clubs, Stahl Hennigsdorf Rugby and Veltener RC.

History
The club was formed in November 1997, when Grün-Weiß Birkenwerder and the Rugbyclub Hohen Neuendorf merged.

It achieved promotion from the Rugby-Regionalliga to the 2nd Rugby-Bundesliga in 2003 and spent three seasons at this level, with a fourth place in 2005 as its best result.

After returning to the Regionalliga in 2006, it won promotion to the second division once more in 2008 and now played there as a mid-table side until 2012 when it was forcefully relegated after missing two league matches without adequate excuse.

A championship in the Regionalliga in 2012–13 took the club back up to the 2nd Bundesliga again for the following season. The club qualified for the DRV-Pokal in 2013–14 and was knocked out by Heidelberger TV in the quarter finals of the play-offs. Promoted to the Rugby-Bundesliga for 2014–15 the club qualified for the championship round where it came seventh and missed out on play-off qualification.

Recent seasons
Recent seasons of the club:

References

External links
  Official website
  RU Hohen Neuendorf club info at totalrugby.de

German rugby union clubs
Rugby clubs established in 1997
Rugby union in Brandenburg
1997 establishments in Germany